Netechma gnathocera is a species of moth of the family Tortricidae that is endemic to Venezuela.

The ground colour of the forewings is yellowish cream. The hindwings are whitish cream, but slightly darker at the apex and with traces of greyish strigulation.

Etymology
The species name refers to the presence of a long terminal plate of the gnathos and is derived from pseudo-Greek ceros (meaning a horn), that is actually attested in ancient Greek as κέρας (kéras).

References

External links

Moths described in 2006
Endemic fauna of Venezuela
Moths of South America
gnathocera